Stanislao Loffreda, O.F.M., (born  15 January 1932) is an Italian Franciscan friar, archaeologist,  Palestinian pottery expert and Bible scholar.

Father Loffreda belongs to the Italian Province of S. Giacomo nelle Marche. He was ordained as a priest in the Order of Friars Minor in 1956. He is licentiate in Holy Scripture and laureate in theology with biblical specialization, M. A. in archeology on the Oriental Institute of Chicago in 1967. He served as a professor of biblical archeology and topography of Jerusalem and the director of Studium Biblicum Franciscanum in Jerusalem (1978-1990). In years 1968-1991 he was a co-director of the excavations at Capernaum by the Sea of Galilee; 1978-1981 on the hilltop palace of Machaerus in Jordan.

Bibliography
Father Loffreda is the author of several books on archeological and historical topics. A selection follows:

See also
 Virgilio Canio Corbo (1918-1991), Franciscan archaeologist
 Michele Piccirillo (1944–2008), Franciscan archaeologist

References

1932 births
Living people
Italian archaeologists
20th-century Italian Roman Catholic priests
Italian Friars Minor
People from the Province of Ascoli Piceno